Leonard Harold Barker III (born July 7, 1955) is a former Major League Baseball right-handed starting pitcher. He pitched the tenth perfect game in baseball history. Barker pitched with the Texas Rangers (1976–78), Cleveland Indians (1979–83), Atlanta Braves (1983–85) and Milwaukee Brewers (1987). During an 11-year baseball career, Barker compiled 74 wins, 975 strikeouts, and a 4.34 earned run average.

Playing career

Early career
Barker was a hard thrower, who early in his career struggled with his control. On April 16, 1978, at Fenway Park, Barker (then with the Texas Rangers) threw a pitch that sailed upward onto the screen above and behind the backstop.  Partly due to this, he did not make the major leagues for good until 1979.

Barker was traded, along with Bobby Bonds, from the Rangers to the Indians for Jim Kern and Larvell Blanks on October 3, 1978.

1981 perfect game

Barker's most notable accomplishment occurred on May 15, 1981, as a member of the Cleveland Indians. On a cold, damp night in Cleveland, Barker pitched the tenth official perfect game in baseball history, defeating the Toronto Blue Jays, 3–0 (the game was originally reported as the ninth perfect game in major league baseball history until the league later changed the criteria for recognizing a perfect game). The final out of the game was a fly ball caught by Rick Manning in short center field. Barker's pitching was so consistent on that night that he never reached ball three against any Blue Jays hitter.

Barker's perfect outing, one of only twenty-three in the history of Major League Baseball, is also the most recent no-hitter thrown by an Indians pitcher. "I run into people almost every day who want to talk about it", Barker said in 2006.  "Everyone says, 'You're probably tired of talking about it.' I say, 'No, it's something to be proud of.' It's a special thing."

Barker was selected for the 1981 Major League Baseball All-Star Game, held in Cleveland on August 9. It was the first game played after a lengthy players' strike, and Barker pitched two scoreless innings before 72,086 fans in his home stadium.

Later career
During the 1983 season, Barker was traded to the Atlanta Braves for Brett Butler, Brook Jacoby, Rick Behenna and $150,000 cash. The trade was initiated by the Braves, who were in a tight race for first in the National League West Division with the Los Angeles Dodgers. Barker pitched reasonably well down the stretch, notching a 3.82 ERA despite only going 1–3 in his six starts after the trade.  After the season, the Braves signed Barker to one of the richest contracts for a pitcher in baseball history to that time, $4 million over five years.

Barker did not pitch as well after the new contract was signed. In 1984, he went 7–8 with a 3.85 ERA before missing the last two months of the season with an elbow injury. The next year, Barker's ERA ballooned to 6.35, and he only managed a 2–9 record. He was released at the end of 1986 spring training with three years remaining on his contract. He signed with the Montreal Expos a few weeks later and spent the season with their top affiliate, the Indianapolis Indians. The Expos released him during 1987 spring training, and he finished his career with the Milwaukee Brewers. Meanwhile, Butler and Jacoby went on to become All-Stars.

Post-playing
After his playing career, Barker returned to the Cleveland area and founded a construction company with a business partner. He and his wife Eva are the parents of Jared, Blake, and Jacob.  He also has three children, Carly, Troy and Lyle with his previous wife,  Bonnie. The Barker family currently resides in Geauga County east of Cleveland. Barker serves as the head coach for Division II Notre Dame College in South Euclid.

See also

 Pitchers who have thrown a perfect game
 List of Major League Baseball annual strikeout leaders

References

External links

Box score for Barker's perfect game
Play-by-play account of Barker's perfect game
The Baseball Gauge
Len Barker at Pura Pelota (Venezuelan Professional Baseball League)
Interview of Len Barker conducted by Dan Coughlin at Cleveland Public Library on July 6, 2016. (audio link)

1955 births
Living people
American League All-Stars
American League strikeout champions
Atlanta Braves players
Baseball players from Kentucky
Cleveland Indians players
Denver Zephyrs players
Gastonia Rangers players
Greenville Braves players
Gulf Coast Rangers players
Indianapolis Indians players
Leones del Caracas players
American expatriate baseball players in Venezuela
Major League Baseball pitchers
Major League Baseball pitchers who have pitched a perfect game
Milwaukee Brewers players
Pittsfield Rangers players
Sacramento Solons players
St. Petersburg Pelicans players
Texas Rangers players
Tucson Toros players